Friends of Amateur Rocketry, better known simply as FAR, is a not-for-profit organization providing infrastructure for testing and launching large amateur and experimental rockets. Their test and launch facility is located North of Edwards Air Force Base and near the Mojave Desert. FAR was begun in 2003 by several friends and rocketry buffs as a spin-off from RRS. The FAR site has been used by multiple groups, including Unreasonable Rocket, CSULB, Garvey Spacecraft Corporation, UCSD,  MythBusters and an episode of How Hard Can It Be? on the National Geographic Channel.

See also
High-power rocketry
Amateur & Experimental rocketry
Reaction Research Society

References

External links 
 FAR Website

Rocketry